Cruz Alta is a municipality in the state of Rio Grande do Sul, Brazil. The town is the seat of the Roman Catholic Diocese of Cruz Alta. Was founded on August 18, 1821.

It is the birthplace writer Érico Veríssimo, of journalist and politician Júlio Prates de Castilhos, and of model and television presenter Luize Altenhofen.

The municipality is known to have given rise to many other municipalities as Ijuí, Santa Maria, Passo Fundo, Santo Angelo and their initial territory led to more other, became known by the northwestern mother.
The municipality belongs to the Northwest Mesoregion Riograndense and Microregion Cruz Alta. It is located at latitude 28 º 38 '19 "south and longitude 53 º 36' 23" west, with an average elevation of 452 meters above sea level. Access to the city is by BR-158, in the north-south axis, the BR-377 to the east, and also by the RS-342 on the west.

The location of the city is logistically important, being considered as a major trunk road and rail in the north central part of the state, with the presence of a dry port in the northeast of the city.

References

See also
 List of municipalities in Rio Grande do Sul

Municipalities in Rio Grande do Sul